Esmail Momtaz od-Dowleh was a notable Iranian statesman of the early twentieth century. Born in Tabriz in 1880, he was one of the original Parliamentarians of the First Majles in 1906. He was also its fourth Speaker.

When the Parliament was bombarded by Mohammad Ali Shah, he was the speaker of majlis and escaped to Paris. In London he interviewed about the crisis which printed in European newspapers.

Momtaz od-Doleh was also Minister of Culture, Minister of Finance, Minister of Education and Minister of Justice. He was the actual writer of the Persian Constitution of 1906, being fluent in French and able to copy extracts lifted from the Belgian constitution.
Momtaz died in 1933 at the age of 54 of coronary heart disease.

References 

Parvin Amini

External links 

 William Morgan Shuster, The Strangling of Persia William Morgan Shuster#The Strangling of Persia

20th-century Iranian politicians
1880 births
1933 deaths
Finance ministers of Iran
Moderate Socialists Party politicians
Speakers of the National Consultative Assembly
Members of the 1st Iranian Majlis
Members of the 2nd Iranian Majlis
Deputies of Tabriz for National Consultative Assembly
Education ministers of Iran
Ministers of Justice of Iran